Mis tres Marías  (English title: My Three Daughters) is a Peruvian telenovela, produced and broadcast by América Televisión in 2016. The show is produced by Michelle Alexander and stars Andrea Montenegro, David Villanueva, Maria Grazia Gamarra, Silvana Canote, Zoe Arevalo, Vanessa Saba, Paul Martin, Karina Jordan, and Rebecca Raez. Ricky Tosso starred in the show as one of the series' antagonists, Gaspar, but had to take a leave of absence due to health issues. His role was later recast with Óscar Carrillo. In July 2016 the show was the highest rated telenovela in Peru.

One of the actors in the show, Vanessa Saba, has commented that she feels that the show has a "lot of heart".

Cast
 Andrea Montenegro as Elena Sanchez of Navarro
 David Villanueva as Leonardo Navarro Madrid / Julian
 Maria Grazia Gamarra as Maria Esperanza Navarro Sanchez
 Silvana Canote as Maria Soledad Navarro Sanchez
 Zoe Arevalo as Maria Paz Navarro Sanchez / Rafaella Belaunde Elizalde
 Vanessa Saba as Jacqueline Elizalde de Belaunde
 Paul Martin as Octavio Belaunde
 Karina Jordan as Emma Donayre Mirror
 Rebecca Raez as Olga Sanchez
 Mauro Ramirez es Marcelo
 Rodrigo Sanchez-Pattino as Francisco Ortega
 Julia Thayt as Dora de Ortega
 Elisa Tenaud as Yvette Ortega
 Maria Jose Cock as Yessenia Ortega
 Gonzalo Molina as Vincent
 Thiago Basurto as Chavito
 Emanuel Soriano as Halley
 Fiorella Days as Pamela

References

External links
  
 

2016 telenovelas
Peruvian telenovelas
Spanish-language telenovelas
América Televisión telenovelas
2016 Peruvian television series debuts
2016 Peruvian television series endings